Pookkollai is a town in the southern area of Thanjavur, in the Indian state of Tamil Nadu. It is relatively a bigger area in the peravurani represented by two ward presidents in the panchayat body.

Etymology

"Poo" in Tamil means flower. "Kollai" in Tamil means garden or backyard. It is widely believed that the word Pookkollai came from the fact the flowers for entire of town of Peravurani and nearby villages were supplied from Pookkollai.

Importance

There are big bore wells deployed in Pookkollai due to higher mineral content and lower salt content in ground water. More than 75% of the water of the entire town is fulfilled by Pookkollai. Pookkollai falls under southern area of Peravurani which is the gateway of Peravurani for the nearby villages whose inhabitants primarily control the politics of Peravurani. Most of the politicians dwell in Pookkollai and it makes it a posh area having higher real estate values.

Important Streets
 Sethu Road
 Bye-pass Road
 Mariyamman kovil Nagar
 Pillaiyar kovil Nagar
 Big Street
 Pookkollai 4road

Important Schools
 Panchayat Union Primary School
 Panchayat Union Kindergarten

Banks
 Indian Overseas Bank

Shops
∗Settu Mutton Stall
∗Rafeek Mutton Stall...These two mutton stalls are famous in Peravurani Thaluk
∗Tea shops, grocery shops, Flour Milling shops, Cycle shops, Etc.

Cities and towns in Thanjavur district